The 1987–88 DDR-Oberliga season was the 40th season of the DDR-Oberliga, the top level of ice hockey in East Germany. Two teams participated in the league, and SC Dynamo Berlin won the championship.

Game results

1st series 

Dynamo Berlin wins series 3 games to 1.

2nd series

Dynamo Berlin wins series 3 games to 1, and the overall series 2-0.

References

External links
East German results 1970-1990

1986–87
Ger
Oberliga
1987 in East German sport
1988 in East German sport